Lye is a commune in the Indre department in central France.

Population

See also
Communes of the Indre department

References

External links

Map of Lye and its environment

Communes of Indre